Liberia–Turkey relations are the foreign relations between Liberia and Turkey. The Turkish ambassador in Accra, Ghana is also accredited to Liberia since 2013. Liberian Embassy in Brussels is accredited to Turkey. Turkey will be opening an embassy in Liberia’s capital Monrovia 'as soon as possible.'

Diplomatic relations 

Turkey and Liberia have close relations because of the close relations between Liberia–United States and Turkey–United States. American Colonization Society created Liberia as a home for freed U.S. slaves — and through this close connection, the U.S. continued to support Liberia economically and politically. Turkey declined to support Liberia during the Doe and Taylor administrations, which caused the death of more than 200,000 Liberians. Since the election of Harvard-trained President Sirleaf, relations between Liberia and Turkey improved considerably.

Cooperating with the consortium of the World Bank, the IMF and the African Development Bank, Turkey raised money to pay off Liberia’s US$3.4 billion foreign debt and provided US$75 million in reconstruction and development assistance to rebuild the country following the First Liberian Civil War and Second Liberian Civil War.

Economic relations 
 Trade volume between the two countries was 191.9 million USD in 2019.

See also 

 Foreign relations of Liberia
 Foreign relations of Turkey

References

Further reading 
 Amin, Samir. Unequal Development: Social Formations at the Periphery of the Capitalist System. Hassocks, England: Harvester Press, 1978. 
 Anderson, Robert Earle. Liberia, America’s African Friend. Chapel Hill: University of North Carolina Press, 2002. 
 Ayittey, George B.N. Africa Unchained: The Blueprint for Africa’s Future. New York: Palgrave Macmillan, 2006. 
 Black Scandal: America and the Liberian Labor Crisis, 1929–1936. Philadelphia: Institute for the Study of International Issues, 1980. 
 Burin, Eric. Slavery and the Peculiar Solution: A History of the American Colonization Society. Gainesville: University Press of Florida, 2005. 
 Calderisi, Robert. The Trouble with Africa: Why Foreign Aid Isn’t Working. New York: Palgrave Macmillan, 2006. 
 Canney, Donald. Africa Squadron: The U.S. Navy and the Slave Trade, 1842–1861. Lanham, Md.: Potomac Books, 2006. 
 Chan, Stephen. Grasping Africa: A Tale of Achievement and Tragedy. New York: Palgrave Macmillan, 2007. 
 Clegg III, Claude A. The Price of Liberty: African Americans and the Making of Liberia. Chapel Hill: University of North Carolina Press, 2004. 
 Collier, Paul. The Bottom Billion: Why the Poorest Countries Are Failing and What Can Be Done about It. New York: Oxford University Press, 2008. 
 Cutter, Charles H. Africa: The World Today Series. 42nd ed. Harpers Ferry, W.V.: Stryker-Post, 2007. 
 Donohugh, Agnes Crawford. The Atlantic Charter and Africa from an American Standpoint: A Study by the Committee on Africa, the War, and Peace Aims. New York: Phelps-Stokes Fund, 1942. 
 Ellis, Stephen. The Mask of Anarchy: The Destruction of Liberia and the Religious Dimension of an African Civil War. Updated ed. New York: New York University Press, 2006. 
 Fahnbulleh, Boima H. Voices of Protest: Liberia on the Edge, 1974–1980. Boca Raton, Fla.: Universal, 2005. 
 Gifford, Paul. Christianity and Politics in Doe’s Liberia. New York: Cambridge University Press, 1993. 
 Huffman, Alan. Mississippi in Africa: The Saga of the Slaves of Prospect Hill Plantation and Their Legacy in Liberia Today. New York: Gotham Books, 2005.
 Hugon, Phillipe. African Geopolitics. Trans. by Steven Rendall. Princeton, N.J.: Markus Wiener, 2008.
 Hyman, Lester S. United States Policy towards Liberia, 1822 to 2003: Un- intended Consequences. Cherry Hill, N.J.: Africana Homestead Legacy, 2007. 
 Kieh Jr., George K. Dependency and the Foreign Policy of a Small Power: The Liberian Case. San Francisco, Calif.: Mellen Research University Press, 1992. 
 Kulah, Arthur F. Liberia Will Rise Again: Reflections on the Liberian Civil Crisis. Nashville, Tenn.: Abingdon Press, 1997. 
 Kunz, Diane B., ed. The Diplomacy of the Crucial Decade: American Foreign Relations during the 1960s. New York: Columbia University Press, 1994. 
 Latham, Michael E. Modernization as Ideology: American Social Science and “Nation Building” in the Kennedy Era. Chapel Hill: University of North Carolina Press, 2000. 
 Levitt, Jeremy. The Evolution of Deadly Conflict in Liberia from ‘Paternaltarianism’ to State Collapse. Durham, N.C.: Carolina Academic Press, 2005. 
 Lyons, Terrence. “Keeping Africa off the Agenda.” In Warren I. Cohen and Nancy Bernkopf Tucker, eds. Lyndon Johnson Confronts the World: American Foreign Policy, 1963–1968. New York: Cambridge University Press, 1994. 
 Moran, Mary H. Liberia: The Violence of Democracy. Philadelphia: University of Pennsylvania Press, 2006. Pham, John Peter. Liberia: Portrait of a Failed State. New York: Reed Press, 2004. 
 Rostow, W.W. Eisenhower, Kennedy, and Foreign Aid. Austin, Texas: University of Texas Press, 1985.
 Sawyer, Amos. Beyond Plunder: Toward Democratic Governance in Liberia. Boulder, Colo.: Lynne Rienner, 2005. 
 Sneh, Itai Natzizenfield. The Future Almost Arrived: How Jimmy Carter Failed to Change U.S. Foreign Policy. New York: Peter Lang Publisher, 2008. 
 Thornton, Richard C., ed. The Carter Years: Toward a New Global Order. New York: Paragon House, 1991. 
 Tyler-McGraw, Marie. An African Republic: Black and White Virginians in the Making of Liberia. Chapel Hill: University of North Carolina Press, 2007.
 Vance, Cyrus R. Hard Choices: Critical Years in America’s Foreign Policy. New York: Simon & Schuster, 1983. 
 Williams, Gabriel I.H. Liberia: The Heart of Darkness. New Bern, N.C.: Trafford, 2006. 
 Wright, Stephen. African Foreign Policies. Boulder, Colo.: Westview, 1998.  
 Young, Andrew. “The United States and Africa: Victory for Diplomacy.” Foreign Affairs 59, no. 4 (America and the World 1980).  

Liberia–Turkey relations
Turkey
Bilateral relations of Turkey